Chauncey Marvin Holt  (October 23, 1921 – June 28, 1997) was an American known for claiming to be one of the "three tramps" photographed in Dealey Plaza shortly after the assassination of President John F. Kennedy.

Background
Holt was born in Kentucky.  He moved to San Diego County in the 1970s and lived in La Mesa, California during the last decade of his life. Holt died of cancer at the age of 75, and was survived by a daughter and granddaughter.

Claims of involvement in JFK assassination
In a 1991 Newsweek article about Oliver Stone's JFK, Holt received national attention for various claims he made regarding the assassination of President Kennedy. According to Holt, he was a CIA operative sent to Dallas to deliver phony Secret Service credentials. He also claimed to have worked as an accountant for Meyer Lansky. His account is further explored in his autobiography Self-Portrait of a Scoundrel, which was posthumously released by TrineDay Publishing in August 2013.

References

External links
Video fragment of 1991 interview
Article by John Mcadams, disputing Holt's confession
Holt's review of Gerald Posner's Case Closed

1921 births
1997 deaths
People associated with the assassination of John F. Kennedy
People from Kentucky
Deaths from cancer in California
Place of birth missing
Place of death missing